Julia A. Schnabel is Professor in Computational Imaging and AI in Medicine (TUM Liesel Beckmann Distinguished Professorship) at Technische Universität München, Director of the Institute of Machine Learning in Biomedical Imaging at Helmholtz Zentrum München (Helmholtz Distinguished Professorship), and Chair of Computational Imaging at the School of Biomedical Engineering and Imaging Sciences at King's College London. Previously, she was Associate Professor in Engineering Science (Medical Imaging) at University of Oxford where she became Full Professor of Engineering Science in 2014.

Education 
Schnabel completed her Diplom (MSc equiv.) in computer science at Technische Universität Berlin in 1993, and her PhD in computer science at University College London in 1998. She held post-doctoral positions at University College London, King’s College London, and at the University Medical Center Utrecht.

Research 
Schnabel's research interests are in machine learning for biomedical imaging, in particular nonlinear motion modelling, multi-modality, dynamic and quantitative imaging with applications in cancer, neuroimaging, cardiovascular diseases, and fetal health.

Selected awards and honours 
Schnabel is an elected member of the MICCAI Society Board (2017–21) and a Technical Representative in the Administrative Committee of the IEEE Engineering in Medicine and Biology Society (2017–19, re-elected 2020-22). She has been a member of the Scientific board of the French Institute for Research in Computer Science and Automation (INRIA) from 2017 to 2019. Furthermore, she was a member of the EPSRC Healthcare Technologies Strategic Advisory Team.
In 2018, Schnabel was awarded a MICCAI Fellowship which is awarded annually to "a small number of senior members of the society in recognition of substantial scientific
contributions to the MICCAI research field and service to the MICCAI community". She was elected as Fellow of the European Laboratory for Learning and Intelligent Systems (ELLIS) for the ELLIS Health programme and as Fellow of the IEEE in 2021 "For contributions to medical image computing".

References 

Living people
Year of birth missing (living people)
British women academics
German women academics
Computer vision researchers
Academics of University College London